John Wilson House may refer to:

 John Wilson House (Jewett City, Connecticut), listed on the NRHP in Connecticut
 John Wilson House (De Soto, Iowa), listed on the NRHP in Dallas County, Iowa
 John E. Wilson House, Dunn, North Carolina, listed on the NRHP in Sampson County, North Carolina
 John T. Wilson Homestead, Seaman, Ohio, listed on the NRHP in Adams County, Ohio
 John Calvin Wilson House, Indiantown, South Carolina, listed on the NRHP in Williamsburg County, South Carolina

See also
Wilson House (disambiguation)